Conor Nash (born 28 July 1998) is a professional Australian rules footballer playing for the Hawthorn Football Club in the Australian Football League (AFL). 

The former Ireland national schoolboy rugby union team player was signed by Hawthorn as a category B rookie in October 2016 in the 2016 rookie draft.

Sporting career
A former Meath minor footballer, in 2016 Nash was offered a Leinster rugby union academy contract, but instead opted to move Down Under and he has not looked back since. Astra both on and off the field Conor Nash is well known for running through the streets of Melbourne on a morning jog. Nash joined  in late 2016 as a Category B rookie, having already represented Ireland U18 rugby side. He made his Box Hill debut in 2017. Nash suffered a severe hamstring injury that cause him to miss half his first season. He was elevated to the main Hawthorn list in July 2018.

AFL career

His form was promising enough that the selectors kept him in the side and he played in two finals.

Nash managed to play fourteen games in the 2019 season but only two in the shorten season of 2020. He was dropped out of the senior side and regulated to the Box Hill affiliate. 
After initially playing his entire career as a forward, at the suggestion of Box Hill coach Sam Mitchell, Nash was deployed as a midfielder. He showed promise in this new position and was selected for Hawthorn's match against the Brisbane Lions on 1 August. In a career-performance, Nash collected 23 disposals, laid nine tackles and won seven clearances as Hawthorn defeated Brisbane 92-80. With Nash in the midfield Hawthorn was undefeated for the next 4 games beating Brisbane, Collingwood and Western Bulldogs and drawing with Richmond.

In 2022, with the illness and then injury to team captain and ruckman Ben McEvoy, Nash was asked to fill in as the second ruckman.

In June 2022, the Hawthorn Football Club announced that Nash had signed a two-year extension lasting until the end of 2024.

Statistics
Updated to the end of the 2022 season.

|-
| 2017 ||  || 45
| 0 || — || — || — || — || — || — || — || — || — || — || — || — || — || — || 0
|-
| 2018 ||  || 45
| 5 || 2 || 4 || 21 || 21 || 42 || 12 || 20 || 0.4 || 0.8 || 4.2 || 4.2 || 8.4 || 2.4 || 4.0 ||  0
|-
| 2019 ||  || 11
| 14 || 9 || 4 || 53 || 71 || 124 || 26 || 38 || 0.6 || 0.3 || 3.8 || 5.1 || 8.9 || 1.9 || 2.7 || 0
|-
| 2020 ||  || 11
| 2 || 0 || 1 || 11 || 5 || 16 || 5 || 0 || 0.0 || 0.5 || 5.5 || 2.5 || 8.0 || 2.5 || 0.0 || 0
|-
| 2021 ||  || 11
| 8 || 2 || 1 || 51 || 59 || 110 || 26 || 23 || 0.3 || 0.1 || 6.4 || 7.4 || 13.8 || 3.3 || 2.9 || 0
|-
| 2022 ||  || 11
| 21 || 2 || 2 || 165 || 161 || 326 || 48 || 86 || 0.1 || 0.1 || 7.9 || 7.7 || 15.5 || 2.3 || 4.1 || 0
|- class="sortbottom"
! colspan=3| Career
! 50 !! 15 !! 12 !! 301 !! 317 !! 618 !! 117 !! 167 !! 0.3 !! 0.2 !! 6.0 !! 6.3 !! 12.4 !! 2.3 !! 3.3 !! 0
|}

Notes

Honours and achievements
Team
 VFL premiership player: 2018

References

External links

1998 births
Living people
VFL/AFL players born outside Australia
Hawthorn Football Club players
Box Hill Football Club players
Gaelic footballers who switched code
Irish expatriate sportspeople in Australia
Irish players of Australian rules football
Irish people of American descent